Kouthuka Varthakal is a 1990 Indian Malayalam film, directed by Thulasidas and produced by Navas. The film stars Mukesh and Suresh Gopi in the lead roles, with Siddique, Mamukkoya, Urvashi and Ranjini in supporting roles. The film has musical score by Johnson. It was partially inspired by Worth Winning (1989). It was a super hit at the box office.

Plot
The movie begins with the arrival of Ramamurthy (Maniyanpilla Raju), a man who has been newly employed as a school teacher at the house of his friend Raveendran "Ravi"(Suresh Gopi), where two other bachelors Pavithran (Siddique) and Mathew Ninan Koshy (Mukesh) live. Mathew is promiscuous, and one night when all of them are drunk, they place a bet on Mathew to woo the woman they choose with 10000 rupees in return for it. Ramamurthy after great difficulty points out a woman they see at a temple, a Tamil woman named Kamalu (Kalpana), who is young but is married to a relatively old man Soorya Narayana Iyer (Innocent). Kamalu falls for Mathew. Pavithran shows him a woman named Rosemary (Ranjini), who takes a longer time to fall for him but does so. To continue the relationship, he breaks up with Kamalu. Raveendran decides to play a trick on Mathew by asking him to seduce his fiancee Ashwathy, whom he thinks will not fall for Mathew and will end his promiscuity. Eventually, Mathew makes Ashwathy fall for him, and this makes Raveendran very angry. He apologises and breaks up with Ashwathy after Raveendran tells him the truth. He decides to marry Rosemary, but fails when she disagrees to it. The film ends with the marriage of Raveendran and Ashwathy and Mathew and Rosemary.

Cast
 
Mukesh as Mathew Ninan Koshy
Suresh Gopi as Raveendran (Ravi) 
Ranjini as Rose Mary
Urvashi as Aswathy 
Siddique as Pavithran 
Maniyanpilla Raju as Ramamoorthy
Mamukkoya as Ahmad Kutty 
Innocent as Soorya Narayana Iyer
Kalpana as Kamalu 
Philomina as Rose Mary's Grandmother 
Sankaradi as Aswathy's Father
N. L. Balakrishnan as Rose Mary's Uncle

References

External links
  
 

1990 films
1990s Malayalam-language films
Films scored by Johnson
Films directed by Thulasidas